Jiří Jan Lobkowicz  (born 1956) is a Swiss-born Czech politician and businessman, and a member of the prominent Lobkowicz family. 

He was president of the Path of Change party in the Czech Republic. 
On 3 May 2012, the party decided to dissolve.

He lives in the town of Mělník in the Czech Republic.

References

External links 
Jiří Lobkowicz (Britské listy)

Czech politicians
Jiri
Living people
1956 births
Freedom Union – Democratic Union politicians